The Papkovich–Neuber solution is a technique for generating analytic solutions to the Newtonian incompressible Stokes equations, though it was originally developed to solve the equations of linear elasticity.

It can be shown that any Stokes flow with body force  can be written in the form:

The properties and ease of construction of harmonic functions makes the Papkovich–Neuber solution a powerful technique for solving the Stokes Equations in a variety of domains.

Further reading
 .
 .

Fluid dynamics